Waldemar de Brito (17 May 1913 – 21 February 1979) was a Brazilian footballer who played as a forward for several clubs in Brazil and Argentina, as well as for the Brazil national team. He is acknowledged to have discovered Pelé during the latter's early footballing days. His brother, Petronilho de Brito, was also a footballer.

Club career

Waldemar, a native of São Paulo, played as an inside forward or as centre forward. At the beginning of his career, he played for the local clubs Syrio, Independência, and São Paulo da Floresta, today's São Paulo FC; he was top goalscorer of the Rio-São Paulo Tournament with 21 goals. The following year, he moved to Botafogo, where he spent a short time, before transferring to San Lorenzo de Almagro in the Argentine first division. In 1936, he returned to Brazil, this time to play for Flamengo. He went back to São Paulo in 1943, to play for Portuguesa de Desportos. He finished his playing career in 1945 with Portuguesa Santista.

International career
Waldemar was capped 18 times for the Brazil national team, scoring 18 goals. He played at the 1934 World Cup, where Brazil was eliminated by Spain in the first round. In that match, Waldemar took a penalty kick for Brazil, but Spain goalkeeper Ricardo Zamora saved his shot.

Post-playing career
After he retired, Waldemar de Brito was part of a project to scout young talents at Bauru Atlético Clube. In 1954, he spotted a kid named Edson Arantes do Nascimento, whom he took to Santos FC, predicting that he would become the greatest footballer in the world. Although Waldemar is recognized for his own talent while he was a player, it is perhaps his scouting of Pelé that makes him most notable in the history of football in Brazil.

References

1913 births
1979 deaths
Footballers from São Paulo
Brazilian footballers
Brazil international footballers
1934 FIFA World Cup players
São Paulo FC players
Botafogo de Futebol e Regatas players
San Lorenzo de Almagro footballers
Argentine Primera División players
Brazilian expatriate footballers
Expatriate footballers in Argentina
CR Flamengo footballers
Sociedade Esportiva Palmeiras players
Associação Portuguesa de Desportos players
Association football forwards
Association football scouts